The  California State Summer School for Mathematics and Science (COSMOS) is a summer program for high school students in California for the purpose of preparing them for careers in mathematics and sciences. It is often abbreviated COSMOS, although COSMOS does not contain the correct letters to create an accurate abbreviation. The program is hosted on four different campuses of the University of California, at Davis, Irvine, San Diego, and Santa Cruz.

History
COSMOS was established by the California State Legislature in the summer of 2000 to stimulate the interests of and provide opportunities for talented California high school students. The California State Summer School for Mathematics & Science is modeled after the California State Summer School for the Arts. In the first summer, 292 students enrolled in the program. Each COSMOS campus only holds 150 students, so selection is competitive.  It is a great experience in exploring the sciences and a good activity for college applications, especially the University of California application.  This program is designed for extremely gifted students who make amazing discoveries in STEM (Science, Technology, Engineering, Mathematics) areas.

References

 State evaluation report of the COSMOS program

External links
 Official site

Schools in California
Science education in the United States
Schools of mathematics
Summer schools
Science and technology in California
2000 establishments in California
Mathematics summer camps